The 2021 Danish Cup final was played on 13 May 2021 between SønderjyskE and Randers FC at Ceres Park, Aarhus, a neutral ground.   Randers captured their second title in team history in the culmination of the 2020–21 Danish Cup, the 67th season of the Sydbank Pokalen.

SønderjyskE appeared in its second consecutive Sydbank Pokalen final, after capturing their first club title of any kind in 2020.  Randers appeared in its third championship game, and its first since 2013.  Randers is now 2–1 in Sydbank Pokalen finals, having won its other title in 2006.

By virtue of the win, Randers earned an automatic berth into the playoff round of the 2021–22 UEFA Europa League.

Teams

Venue
For just the fourth time in cup history, the final will be played in a venue other than the Copenhagen Sports Park (1955–1990), or Parken Stadium (1993–2019). Ceres Park in Aarhus will host its first ever Sydbank Pokalen final in 2021. Odense Stadium hosted the 1991 final while the 1992 final was played at Aarhus Idrætspark.

Route to the final

Note: In all results below, the score of the finalist is given first (H: home; A: away).

Match

Details
</onlyinclude>

References

Danish Cup Finals
Danish Cup Final
Danish Cup Final
Sports competitions in Denmark